My Wife Theresa is a 1942 German comedy film directed by Arthur Maria Rabenalt and starring Elfie Mayerhofer, Hans Söhnker, and Rolf Weih.

The film's sets were designed by the art director Erich Grave.

Cast

References

External links

Films of Nazi Germany
German comedy films
1942 comedy films
Films directed by Arthur Maria Rabenalt
German black-and-white films
Tobis Film films
1940s German films